The governor of Negros Occidental is the local chief executive and head of the Provincial Government of Negros Occidental. Along with the Governor of Negros Oriental and the Mayor of the highly urbanized city of Bacolod, he serves as one of the chief executives of Negros Island in the Philippines.

Formation
Before independence, the position had been occupied by appointed Spanish military commanders that also serve the role of Governor since the transfer of the capital to Bacolod in 1849. Previously, the local chief executive post was vested on the "Corregidor," or the commander of the military outpost, in the two previous capitals of Ilog, Negros Occidental and Himamaylan.

After the Negros Revolution, all provincial authority divested on the Office of the President and Vice President, representing Negros Occidental and Negros Oriental. Americans occupied the fledgling republic and requested the provisional government to conduct an island-wide election for the gubernatorial post. Melecio Severino of Silay emerged as the first elected governor.

Line of succession
As with the President of the Philippines, the role of Governor is passed on to the Vice Governor of Negros Occidental in case of incapacity, resignation or death. But unlike the national line of succession, the Board Member designated as the first in line for garnering the highest number of votes succeeds as Vice Governor, also the same should only the Vice Governor be incapacitated. Should both the Governor and Vice Governor be incapacitated, the same would succeed as Governor and the Board Member with the second highest number of votes would succeed as Vice Governor.

Duties and related offices
By the convention set for the newly-created Negros Island Region, the Governor of Negros Occidental sits as chairperson of one of the two regional councils, namely the Regional Development Council and the Regional Peace and Order Council. Currently, the Governor of Negros Occidental is Eugenio Jose "Bong" Lacson.

A Spouse of the Governor of Negros Occidental is accorded the title of "First Lady," but alternatively called "Gubernatorial First Lady" or "Provincial First Lady," as not to confuse with the office of the First Lady of the Philippines. Unlike the First Lady of the Philippines, the Provincial First Lady is not accorded a formal ceremonial role, but rather conventionally represents the Governor in the social activities of the province.

List of governors

Spanish governors of Negros province
From the formal establishment of the military outpost in the pueblo of Ilog until the promulgation of a royal decree dividing the island into Negros Occidental and Negros Oriental on October 25, 1889, Negros Island was governed as a single province starting from being under the jurisdiction of Oton, Iloilo until it established its capitals in Ilog (1734), Himamaylan (1795) and Bacolod (1849).

Spanish governors of Negros Occidental
Governor General Valeriano Wéyler promulgated a royal decree in October 25, 1889, which divided the island into two provinces, namely Negros Occidental and Negros Oriental, upon the request of the 13 Augustinian Recollect friars administering the towns east of the island. Bacolod was retained as the capital of Negros Occidental.

Revolutionary government

Filipino governors
This list includes governors appointed or elected since the end of Spanish rule, the recognized start of the institutional office.

References

Governors of Negros Occidental
Governors of provinces of the Philippines